The Női NB I (for "Women's National Championship") is the top level women's football league in Hungary. Organized by the Hungarian Football Federation, it features eight teams. The champion qualifies for a spot in the UEFA Women's Champions League.

Format
From 2007–08 to 2009–10 eight teams played two double round-robins (so 28 matches) to decide the champion.

For the 2010–11 season the league was extended to ten teams and a playoff system was adopted. After the regular season, which was reduced to a double round-robin tournament, the top 5 teams qualified for the championship playoff. At the start of the playoff the results against the teams failing to reach the championship playoff are subtracted. The five teams then play another double round-robin (for 8 additional matches) to crown the champion. The relegation playoff round works in the same way with the bottom five placed teams after the regular season.

Since the 2014–15 season the two top teams after the championship play-off will play a championship final.

Champions
List of champions and top scorers.

Most titles
Below is a ranking of the clubs by most titles won.

References

External links
mlsz.hu - Official site of the Hungarian Football Federation
League at UEFA
League at soccerway.com
noilabdarugas.hu - News portal dealing with the Hungarian Women's National Championship
 Kötényblog - Hungary's first ever women's soccer blog

Women
Hun
1
Women's sports leagues in Hungary
Professional sports leagues in Hungary